Ralph Budelman (April 19, 1918 – October 24, 2002) was an American water polo player. He competed in the men's tournament at the 1948 Summer Olympics. In 1979, he was inducted into the USA Water Polo Hall of Fame.

See also
 List of men's Olympic water polo tournament goalkeepers

References

External links
 

1918 births
2002 deaths
Water polo players from Chicago
American male water polo players
Water polo goalkeepers
Olympic water polo players of the United States
Water polo players at the 1948 Summer Olympics